Drop Dead Sexy is a 2005 American comedy film starring Jason Lee and Crispin Glover.

Plot
When their money scam goes into the ground, two would-be thieves (Jason Lee and Crispin Glover) turn to kidnapping in an attempt to blackmail their target.

Cast
Jason Lee as Frank
Crispin Glover as Eddie
Pruitt Taylor Vince as Spider
Melissa Keller as Crystal
Audrey Marie Anderson as Natalie
Lin Shaye as Ma Muzzy
Xander Berkeley as Harkness
Burton Gilliam as Big Tex
Joseph D. Reitman as Tiny
Diane Klimaszewski as Brandy
Elaine Klimaszewski as Amber
Brad Dourif as Herman
Amber Heard as Candy
Suzanna Urszuly as Sky

References
 
 

2005 comedy films
2005 films
2000s crime comedy films
American crime comedy films
Films scored by Deborah Lurie
2000s English-language films
2000s American films